The 1999 World Table Tennis Championships men's singles was the 45th edition of the men's singles championship. 

Liu Guoliang defeated Ma Lin in the final, winning three sets to two to secure the title.

Results

See also
 List of World Table Tennis Championships medalists

References

-